Fierce!  is an international performance festival (previously produced by Fierce Earth) that has taken place annually in and around Birmingham, England since 1997.

The launch of the 2004 festival, in May in Birmingham, England, was a group of hot air balloons that drifted over Birmingham's streets in the early hours of the morning playing soft music to "encourage dreams related to the music".

In May 2007, the artwork Una White was created as part of the festival.

Fierce! 11 was be held over the May Bank Holiday, 23 to 26 May 2008 and the artists taking part in the festival were be chosen by way of a public vote.  The voting commenced on 20 March 2008 and conclude on 11 April 2008.

The Birmingham Repertory Theatre, Warwick Arts Centre and Birmingham Hippodrome also collaborate heavily in the events.

In 2011 Fierce Festival reappeared after several years absence under the new joint artistic direction of Laura McDermott and Harun Morrison with the tagline 'Live Art. Collision. Super Local. Hyper Now.'

In 2013 Fierce launched Club Fierce XXX featuring New York rapper Cakes Da Killa grime MC Roxxxan, and electro punk satirist Quilla Constance.

In 2016, Aaron Wright became Artistic Director and the first festival under his leadership took place in 2017.

In 2019 The Guardian Newspaper gave the Festival five stars and described it as 'a daring whirl of theatrical thrills'

The festival has also presented performances by numerous artists including Ron Athey, Franko B, Gob Squad, Tim Miller, Forced Entertainment and more.

External links
New Fierce Festival site
Official Fierce! site
Fierce! 11 site
Blog containing reports and pictures of Fierce! events in 2003, 2005 and 2006
BBC: Birmingham Birdman, Fierce Festival - article by Ciarán Ryan

References

Festivals in Birmingham, West Midlands
Art museums and galleries in Birmingham, West Midlands
Arts festivals in England